Lauren O'Connell is an American chemist who is an assistant professor in the Department of Biology at Stanford University. Her research considers how animals handle challenges in their environment. She received a L'Oréal-USA For Women in Science fellowship in 2015.

Early life and education 
O'Connell is from rural Texas. She grew up on a goat farm in a family of six. She has said that growing up on a farm and working with animals made her enthusiastic about science. After high school, she attended Tarrant County College, where she spent two years before joining Cornell University. At Cornell, she became interested in animal behavior from a mechanistic perspective. After completing her undergraduate degree, she moved to the University of Texas at Austin, where she studied social networks in Cichlid fish with Hans Hofmann.

Research and career 
Whilst a postdoctoral researcher at Harvard University, O'Connell studied poison dart frogs in the Amazon rainforest. She had become interested in the evolution of parental care in an animal clade that had a lot of variation in reproductive strategies. During her postdoctoral research, she founded the “Little Froggers School Program”, a scheme which supports K–12 teachers in learning more about amphibians. At Harvard, she held a Bauer Fellowship.

O'Connell joined the faculty at Stanford University in 2017. Her research considers genetic and environmental contributions to the behavior of poison frogs. O'Connell noted that maternal behavior has only evolved once in mammals, and wanted to identify whether there were different ways to build a maternal brain. She identified that mother frogs transfer their poisons to their offspring in an effort to provide some chemical defences to their young tadpoles.

Awards and honors 
 2014 L'Oréal-USA For Women in Science Fellowship
 2016 Changing Face of STEM Mentorship award
 2018 Frank A. Beach Early Career Award
 2018 Hellman Faculty Fellow
 2019 Kavli Fellow of the National Academy of Sciences

Selected publications

Personal life 
O'Connell completed a professional training qualification in culturally aware mentorship to be able to better support students from historically marginalized groups.

References 

Cornell University alumni
Scientists from Texas
Stanford University faculty
American academics
Women chemists
Year of birth missing (living people)
Living people